Deshamanya Kanapathipillai William "Bill" Devanayagam (26 March 1910 – 17 December 2002) was a Sri Lankan Tamil lawyer, politician, government minister and Member of Parliament.

Early life
Devanayagam was born on 26 March 1910. A Roman Catholic, Devanayagam was educated at St. Joseph's College, Colombo. A keen sportsman, he captained the school's cricket team in 1930 and was the East Ceylon champion in tennis. After school Devanayagam joined Ceylon Law College, qualifying as a proctor.

Career
Devanayagam practised law in Kalkudah, Batticaloa District for many years.

Devanayagam stood as an independent candidate for Kalkudah at the 1947 parliamentary election but was defeated by V. Nalliah. He contested the 1965 parliamentary election as a United National Party candidate. He won the election and entered Parliament. He was re-elected at the 1970 and 1977 parliamentary elections. He was appointed Minister of Justice in July 1977. He became Minister of Home Affairs in February 1980.

Death 
Devanayagam died on 17 December 2002.

References

1910 births
2002 deaths
Alumni of Ceylon Law College
Alumni of Saint Joseph's College, Colombo
Ceylonese proctors
Deshamanya
Home affairs ministers of Sri Lanka
Justice ministers of Sri Lanka
Members of the 6th Parliament of Ceylon
Members of the 7th Parliament of Ceylon
Members of the 8th Parliament of Sri Lanka
People from Eastern Province, Sri Lanka
People from British Ceylon
Sri Lankan Roman Catholics
Sri Lankan Tamil lawyers
Sri Lankan Tamil politicians
United National Party politicians